Severn Vale School is a secondary school with academy status in Quedgeley, Gloucester, England. Its students are aged from 11 to 16. The headmaster is Richard Johnson.

In 2011, Ofsted rated the school as "good".

GCSEs
GCSEs are the final examinations students take at the school. Being a technology college, students take a design and technology subject. The choice is food technology, resistant materials, textiles, or graphic design. There are also a variety of other subjects that can be taken. Students must take English, mathematics, science and a short course in religious education. Students must attend physical education lessons, but will only be examined if they choose to study it at GCSE level. Students may choose to continue studying the modern language they studied at Key Stage level.

GCSE results have steadily improved at the school. In 2004, only 40% of students gained 5 or more GCSE grades A*-C. In 2012, 89% of students achieved 5 or more A*-C grades, with 65% achieving 5 A*-C grades including English and Maths.

References

External links
 Severn Vale School

Secondary schools in Gloucestershire
Academies in Gloucestershire